The 1991 All-Africa Games football tournament was the 5th edition of the African Games men's football tournament. The football tournament was held in Cairo, Egypt between 21 and 30 September 1991 as part of the 1991 All-Africa Games.

Qualification

The following countries qualified for the final tournament.

Squads

Final tournament
All times given as local time (UTC+2)

Group stage

Group A

Group B

Knockout stage

7th Place Match

5th Place Match

Semifinals

Third-place match

Final

Final ranking

References

External links
African Games 1991 - rsssf.com

1991
1991 All-Africa Games
1991
All
1991 African Games